Steven Hayes may refer to:

Steve Hayes (businessman), English businessman and former owner of rugby union side London Wasps
Steve Hayes (basketball) (born 1955), American basketball player
Steve Hayes (footballer) (born 1985), Australian soccer player
Steve Hayes (soccer) (born 1959), American soccer player and coach
Linda Hayes (born 1963 as Steven Joseph Hayes), perpetrator of the Cheshire home invasion murders
Steven C. Hayes (born 1948), psychologist

See also
 Stephen Hayes (disambiguation)